

379001–379100 

|-bgcolor=#f2f2f2
| colspan=4 align=center | 
|}

379101–379200 

|-id=130
| 379130 Lopresti ||  || Claudio Lopresti, an Italian amateur astronomer and founder of the Digital Astronomy Group as well as a discoverer of numerous variable stars. In 2007, he discovered the first transit of an extrasolar planet in the constellation of Cassiopeia. || 
|-id=155
| 379155 Volkerheinrich ||  || Volker Heinrich (born 1962), a German amateur astronomer and chairman of the Astronomy Section of the "Physikalischer Verein" at Frankfurt, Germany || 
|-id=173
| 379173 Gamaovalia ||  || Galina (born 1935), Mariya (born 1940), Oktyabrina (born 1938), Vassiliy (born 1944) and Lev (born 1947), the brothers and sisters of astronomer Klim Churyumov (1937–2016), co-discoverer of comet 67P || 
|}

379201–379300 

|-bgcolor=#f2f2f2
| colspan=4 align=center | 
|}

379301–379400 

|-bgcolor=#f2f2f2
| colspan=4 align=center | 
|}

379401–379500 

|-bgcolor=#f2f2f2
| colspan=4 align=center | 
|}

379501–379600 

|-bgcolor=#f2f2f2
| colspan=4 align=center | 
|}

379601–379700 

|-bgcolor=#f2f2f2
| colspan=4 align=center | 
|}

379701–379800 

|-bgcolor=#f2f2f2
| colspan=4 align=center | 
|}

379801–379900 

|-bgcolor=#f2f2f2
| colspan=4 align=center | 
|}

379901–380000 

|-bgcolor=#f2f2f2
| colspan=4 align=center | 
|}

References 

378001-379000